The Penny Ice Cap, formerly Penny Icecap, is a  ice cap in Auyuittuq National Park of Baffin Island, Nunavut, Canada. It is a remnant of the last ice age. During the mid-1990s, Canadian researchers studied the glacier's patterns of freezing and thawing over centuries by drilling ice core samples.

The ice cap has been thinning and its valley glaciers have been retreating in recent decades related to rising summer and winter air temperatures across the eastern Arctic.

The ice cap is named after Captain William Penny, a whaling captain from Aberdeen in Scotland who pioneered over-wintering with native Inuit at Cumberland Sound in order to be able to start whaling (in the 19th century) much earlier in the season. He was also engaged by Lady Franklin to search for John Franklin, lost with all his crew in the search for the Northwest Passage.

See also
List of glaciers

References

Bodies of ice of Baffin Island
Arctic Cordillera
Ice caps of Canada